This article is a list of winners and nominees of regular Hungarian comic awards, sorted by awards, followed by category.

Alfabéta prize 
Note: the years listed in the following tables marks the year the prize was awarded, the related comics were made in the preceding year.

Best Comic 
(At least 20 pages long.)

Winners

Nominees

Best Short Story 
(Between 3 and 19 pages)

Winners

Nominees

Best Comic Strip

Winners

Nominees

Best Single- or Double-page Comic

Winners

Nominees

Ernő Zórád Prize 
Honoring a comic creator's outstanding yearly achievement. The prize was first awarded at the 100th anniversary of Ernő Zórád's birth with the contribution of the artist's family.
 2011: Attila Futaki

Kepregeny.net Audience Polls 
Every year since 2006, Kepregeny.net gives place to the annual audience polls to record comic book fans' opinion on the preceding year's crop. These polls cover many topics, not only Hungarian comics, but also translated materials, journalists, etc. In the first two years the polls were held on the portal's forum, in 2008 it moved to its opening page.
Note: the year given in each poll refers to the year the comics were published (in contrary to the Alfabéta prize, where the year refers to date the prize was given.)

2005

2006

2007 

Comics-related lists
Lists of award winners
Comics award winners